Winooka was a bay Australian thoroughbred stallion who raced for 5 seasons from a two-year-old to a six-year-old including America recording major wins from 6 furlongs to 1 mile and winning jockeys being Stan Davidson from Newcastle and Sydney Australian Racing Hall of Fame inductees Jim Pike and Edgar Britt.

Breeding

Winooka was bred by Percy Miller Kia Ora Stud Scone in the Hunter Region. Sire Windbag (AUS) winner of 1925 VRC Melbourne Cup with major winners including the champion miler Chatham 1932 & 1934 MVRC W S Cox Plate, 1932 & 1933 Epsom Handicap and Liberal 1932 VATC Caulfield Guineas, 1932 VRC Derby and VATC Underwood Stakes.

Dam Kanooka (AUS) won the 1925 AJC Gimcrack Stakes at Randwick Racecourse.

Racing career

Winooka was purchased at the 1930 Sydney yearling sales for 290 guineas by H.C. Taylor from Scone and originally trained in Brisbane by Tim Brosnan of Lough Neagh fame. After 2 starts was sold to new owners W.A. McDonald and A.J. Mathews for 1,000 guineas who were well known Sydney bookmakers.

Winooka raced between 1930 and 1935 winner of 3 Group 1 races in the modern era the 1933 VATC Futurity Stakes, Caulfield 7 furlong record, 1933 AJC Doncaster Handicap carrying 63 kg in Australasian record time, 1933 AJC All Aged Plate by 5 lengths and second 1935 VATC Oakleigh Plate carrying 66 kg.

Winooka as a five year old was shipped to the United States with trainer Mick Polson and jockey Edgar Britt to compete in nine highly publicised races winning two 'Match Races' at Tanforan Racetrack, San Francisco and Longacres Racetrack Seattle and two other races at Pimlico Racecourse, being the 1933 Baltimore and Autumn Handicaps under management of colourful Australian sporting entrepreneur and horse racing identity Rufe Naylor.

With Jim Pike up, Winooka's final race was the 1935 Doncaster Handicap. During the race he was galloped on and both his hind tendons were cut. He subsequently recovered and was retired to stud in New South Wales.

Trainer Mick Polson 1886-1957 was originally from Melbourne his stables were located at Kogarah near Moorefield Racecourse, Sydney and later at High Street Randwick also trained wonder miler Fuji San winner of 17 races including the 1925 AJC Doncaster Handicap, 1926 Tatts Tramway Handicap carrying 63 kg and 1927 AJC All Aged Stakes also second to Amounis 1926 AJC Epsom Handicap carrying 61 kg. Mick Polson was mentor to the champion jockeys Edgar Britt and the dynamic Billy Lappin who was tragically killed in 1940.

Australian Starts: 30 starts 11 wins, 6 seconds, 5 thirds

American Starts:     9 starts 4 wins, 1 second, 1 third

Image gallery

1933 racebooks

References 

Australian horses
Thoroughbred racehorses